Martin Baker may refer to:

 Martin-Baker, a British manufacturer of aircraft ejection seats
 Martin Baker (footballer) (born 1974), Scottish footballer
 Martin Baker (organist) (born 1967), English organist
 Martin Baker, candidate in the United States House of Representatives elections in Missouri, 2010 and 2014

Baker, Martin